Jennifer Cohen (born 1969) is the athletic director at the University of Washington.

College
A native of Tacoma, Washington, Cohen graduated from San Diego State University in 1991, then earned a master's degree in physical education with an emphasis in sports administration, from Pacific Lutheran University in 1994.

Career
Cohen became interim athletic director at the University of Washington on February 1, 2016.  On May 25, 2016, Cohen became the seventeenth athletic director of the University of Washington. At the time of her appointment, Cohen was one of just three female athletic directors in the Power Five conferences and the only female AD in the Pac-12.

Cohen worked as an athletics administrator at Pacific Lutheran University, the University of Puget Sound, and Texas Tech University, as well as the University of Washington beginning in 1998.

Family
Cohen is married to Bill Cohen. They are the parents of two sons, Tyson and Dylan.

References

External links
 Washingtpn profile

1969 births
Living people
Washington Huskies athletic directors
Pacific Lutheran University alumni
San Diego State University alumni
Texas Tech University people
People from Tacoma, Washington
Women college athletic directors in the United States